Sporting Ilam De Mechi FC is a Nepali professional franchise  football club based Ilam Municipality. The club currently competes in the Nepal Super League, the top flight of football in Nepal.

History

References

Association football clubs established in 2022
2022 establishments in Nepal
Nepal Super League
Football clubs in Nepal